NPAS may refer to:

 National Performing Arts School, in Dublin, Ireland
 National Police Air Service, of England and Wales
 National Public Alerting System, in Canada